Marshall Fundamental Secondary School is a secondary school located in Pasadena, California, United States, at 990 North Allen Avenue, and is part of the Pasadena Unified School District.

History
Named after United States Supreme Court Justice John Marshall, ground was broken for construction in 1924, with completion of the main building in 1925.  Several expansions occurred in the following decades; in the 1930s (North Building), 1960s (Cafeteria), 1970s (Bungalows - demolished in 2015), 2000s (Science Building) and 2010s (Gymnasium/ M Building).  Marshall was a junior high school for nearly fifty years, from its opening until the 1973-1974 school year, when it became a fundamental school (K-12).  In 1976, grades K-6 were moved to other campuses (Longfellow, Washington), but the sixth grade level was reinstated during the 1985-1986 year.

Curriculum
Marshall has the following Advanced Placement courses.
 English Language
 English Literature
 Calculus AB
 Calculus BC
 Statistics
 Biology
 Chemistry
 Environmental Science
 Physics
 Human Geography
 World History
 US History
 US Government
 Macro Economics
 Spanish Language
 Spanish Literature
 Music Theory
 Studio Art 2D, 3D, and Drawing
 Psychology
 Capstone Research
 Capstone Seminar
 Computer Science
 Trigonometry

Extracurricular Activity
Marshall Fundamental offers many extracurricular activities such as clubs, sports, dances, and music programs.
Clubs include Cultural Clubs: Armenian Club, Asian Club, Black Student Union, Hispanic Heritage, and Pilipino Club. Community Service Clubs: National Honor Society, Key Club, Hispanic National Honor Society, the Little Helpers Club, Storytellers Club. Special Interest Clubs: ACI Club, Animal Club, Art Legacy Club, Art Club, ASB Club, Book Club, Buddy Club, Business Club, Cheer Club, Chess Club, Christian Club, Cycling Club, Drama Club, Dungeons & Dragons Club, Fantic, Gaming, Girls Build LA, Golf Club, Harambee, Jazz Club, Journalism, Math Club, Music Club, Nature Club, Orchestra, Rise Up, Rhino Club, Robotics, SAGE Club.  Ultimate Frisbee, Yearbook, Class Classes, Sports Clubs, and more. Students also have the opportunity to create and charter their own club through approval by the Associated Student Body.

High School Athletics: Baseball, Boys & Girls Basketball, Cheerleading, Cross Country, Diving, Girls Golf, Boys & Girls Soccer, Softball, Swimming, Boys & Girls Tennis, Track & Field, Volleyball, and Wrestling,

Music courses that are offered consist of orchestra, band, and choir. Each type of music can be taken in a beginning, intermediate, or advanced class. The award-winning Marshall Fundamental Marching Band is regarded as the best music program in the Pasadena Unified School District. It won 3rd place in the 2014 SCSBOA Field Tournament Championships in the 1A division.

Sports
The teams are named the Marshall Eagles and their uniforms display white, blue, and red. Some teams have different colors for away games.

The sports at Marshall include:
 Cross country
 Girls tennis
 Girls' volleyball
 Girls' soccer
 Boys' soccer
 Girls' basketball
 Boys' basketball
 Track and field
 Swimming
 Boys' tennis
 Baseball
 Softball
 Girls Golf
 Marching band
 Winterguard
 Cheer
 Dance Team
 Wrestling

Academic Performance
Jay Mathews, an educator and education reporter for the Washington Post, listed Marshall Fundamental as the 130th best high school as of 2007, chiefly due to its vast number of underprivileged students, high graduation rate, and 70% free and reduced lunch program. This was enough to be singled out for the cover of Newsweek, and was featured exclusively as one of America's best schools. Marshall was first posted in 2003 as 119th, but fell in the following years to 255 in 2005, and 286 in 2006. It saw a jump in the 2012 school year, rising 156 places, back into the top 10%. Marshall in 2017 was ranked 897 overall in the nation and 152 in the state of California.

As of 2022, Marshall is ranked by U.S. News & World Report as being the 190th-ranked high school in California, and the 1,303rd ranked high school in the nation.

Notable alumni
Tamala Jones, actress, Castle
Paul Rodriguez Jr., comedian
Brian Taylor, writer and director, Crank
Edward Van Halen, musician, Van Halen (junior high only)
Alex Van Halen, musician, Van Halen (junior high only)
Lark Voorhies, actress, Saved by the Bell
Jaleel White, actor, Family Matters

References

External links

Public middle schools in California
Middle schools in Los Angeles County, California
Public high schools in Los Angeles County, California
Pasadena Unified School District
Educational institutions established in 1924
Schools in Pasadena, California
1924 establishments in California